Minervarya syhadrensis, commonly known as long-legged cricket frog, Syhadra frog, Bombay wart frog, and many others, is a species of frog in the family Dicroglossidae found in India, Bangladesh, and Nepal at low to moderate elevations. It is the type species of genus Minervarya. In view of its wide distribution and stable population trend, IUCN assessors listed it as Least Concern in 2009 and 2016.

Description 
The long-legged cricket frog is a small-sized frog. Females reach a snout–vent length (SVL) of 20.7–22.8 mm. Males are smaller with a SVL of 17.5–19.1 mm.

Distribution and habitat 
Long-legged cricket frogs are widely distributed over much of central northern India and western Peninsular India, Bangladesh, southern Nepal, from lower Punjab to Sindh in Pakistan, and found at elevations below .

Behaviour and ecology 
During the breeding season, males emit advertisement calls, using a single subgular external vocal sac. They start calling after one or two heavy pre-monsoon or monsoon rains in April to June, and continue up to the end of the rainy season in September to October. They call mainly during the night beginning after dusk and continue until the early morning of the following day, preferably sitting in temporary shallow water pools under partly submerged grass or paddy. They call in chorus but maintain a distance of 0.5 to 1 m to each other. Their calls are antiphonal between the two nearest calling males and consist of a series of pulse groups varying per call between 7 and 28.

References

External links 
 Photo of Fejervarya syhadrensis by photographer Manoj C. Sindagi

syhadrensis
Amphibians of Bangladesh
Frogs of India
Amphibians of Nepal
Amphibians of Pakistan
Frogs of Sri Lanka
Amphibians described in 1919
Taxa named by Nelson Annandale